This is a list of military installations in Texas, in the United States.

See also
List of United States military bases

 
Military installations
Texas